Fine Sani Vea (born 19 November 1959) is a Tongan boxer. He competed in the men's light heavyweight event at the 1984 Summer Olympics, losing his first bout to Georgică Donici of Romania. Sani won a gold medal in the light heavyweight division at the 1982 Commonwealth Games while representing Fiji despite not having Fijian citizenship.

Honours
National honours
  Order of Queen Sālote Tupou III, Member (31 July 2008).

References

External links
 

1959 births
Living people
Light-heavyweight boxers
Fijian male boxers
Tongan male boxers
Olympic boxers of Tonga
Boxers at the 1984 Summer Olympics
Commonwealth Games gold medallists for Fiji
Boxers at the 1982 Commonwealth Games
Commonwealth Games medallists in boxing
Place of birth missing (living people)
Members of the Order of Queen Sālote Tupou III
Medallists at the 1982 Commonwealth Games